Bilpura is a census town in Jabalpur district  in the state of Madhya Pradesh, India.

Demographics
 India census, Bilpura had a population of 11,812. Males constitute 53% of the population and females 47%. Bilpura has an average literacy rate of 70%, higher than the national average of 59.5%; with male literacy of 78% and female literacy of 60%. 13% of the population is under 6 years of age.

References

Cities and towns in Jabalpur district